Oncodelphax is a genus of true bugs belonging to the family Delphacidae.

The species of this genus are found in Europe.

Species:
 Oncodelphax improvisa Emeljanov, 1982 
 Oncodelphax micula Emeljanov, 1982

References

Delphacidae